South Valley is a neighborhood on the South side of Syracuse, New York. It features Meachem Elementary School, Clary Middle School, Betts Branch library, Webster's Pond, and the Redmond family.

Polaski King House, William H. Sabine House, and John Gridley House are listed on the National Register of Historic Places.

Geography
It borders two other Syracuse neighborhoods, with North Valley and Outer Comstock to the north. Nedrow, a hamlet (and a census designated place) in the town of Onondaga is to the south.

References

External links 
 City of Syracuse (Official Site) Neighborhoods

Neighborhoods in Syracuse, New York